Les Babas Cool is a French comedy film directed by François Leterrier. It was released in 1981.

Plot
Antoine Bonfils is a household appliance salesman. His car breaks down close to a farm. Looking for help, he figures out that the people there are living in a commune, like hippies.

Cast
 Philippe Léotard : Blaise
 Christian Clavier : Antoine Bonfils
 Marie-Anne Chazel : Aline
 Martin Lamotte : Gilles 
 Charlotte de Turckheim : Christine
 Paul Préboist : M. Triconet
 Catherine Frot : Véronique
 Nadia Barentin : Tania
 Sophie Renoir : Charlotte
 Richard Bohringer : Paul
 Anémone : Alexandra
 Bruno Moynot : Doctor Jean Morin

References

External links

1981 films
1981 comedy films
Films directed by François Leterrier
French comedy films
1980s French films